Supernews may refer to:
 SuperNews!, an animated television series
 Supernews (Usenet provider)